ShipSpace was an interactive maritime museum in Inverness, Scotland. The museum was situated along the historic Caledonian Canal at the Muirtown Basin. The 1:10 scale Titanic model was one of the main attractions.

Inside the museum building there were various interactive exhibits, photos, posters and information about the ship available as well as a rolling film that showed divers going down to the sunken ship.

Outside, the 1:10 scale Titanic model was the centrepiece of the museum. The scale model contained three main rooms: a Parisian-styled café, a replica bridge, and a Marconi radio communications room.

Other exhibits outside included:

A replica of the Nautile submarine, one of the mini-submersibles that dove 3 miles down to the Titanic.
The Guiding Star, a West-Coast creel fishing boat which was the last built at Inverness Thornbush slipway.
A full-scale replica of the Star of Hope, the first herring drifter from Buckie.
A 45 ft RNLI Watson-class lifeboat.

The museum was in the east building, which had been constructed in the mode of the original west building, a toll house. The two buildings were separated by a corridor.

Ship Space is now permanently closed since April 2018 following the untimely death of the owner/curator, Stan Fraser.

References

External links

Buildings and structures in Inverness
Maritime museums in Scotland